GGU may refer to:

Education 
 Gokul Global University, in Gujarat, India
 Golden Gate University, in San Francisco, California, United States
 Guru Ghasidas Vishwavidyalaya, in Chhattisgarh, India

Other uses 
 Gban language
 Geological Survey of Greenland
 GGU, a codon for the amino acid glycine
 Good Game University, now Team Coast, an eSports team